Wesleyan University and Wesleyan College are the names of educational institutions derived from the adjective Wesleyan.

Colleges and universities named Wesleyan include:

Colleges and universities with Wesleyan in their name include:

Learned societies with Wesleyan in their name include:

Other colleges and universities with a Wesleyan affiliation include:

See also
 Wesley College (disambiguation)
 Wellesley College